Nemacheilus shehensis is a species of ray-finned fish in the genus Nemacheilus from India. Some authorities place N. shehensis in Triplophysa.

References

 

S
Fish described in 1987